Linnea Jonasson (born 7 December 1997) is a Swedish former footballer who played for Vittsjö GIK. In 2017, at 19 years old, Jonasson retired from football following two significant knee injuries. The first of her injuries was a cruciate ligament injury and occurred before she joined Vittsjö.

Personal life
From Hässleholm, Jonasson was born to Helena and Andreas Jonasson. She has a brother, Alvin, and a sister, Ella.

External links

References

1997 births
Living people
Swedish women's footballers
Vittsjö GIK players
Damallsvenskan players
Women's association football midfielders